Vinod Singh may refer to the following persons:

 Vinod Singh (actor)
 Vinod Singh (Gonda politician)
 Vinod Singh (Sultanpur politician)